The Heirloom Project is a collection of traditional Unix utilities. Most of them are derived from original Unix source code, as released as open-source by Caldera and Sun.

The project has the following components:

 The Heirloom Toolchest: awk, cpio, grep, tar, pax, etc.
 The Heirloom Bourne Shell sh
 The Heirloom Documentation Tools: nroff, troff, dpost, etc.
 The Heirloom Development Tools: lex, yacc, m4, and SCCS
 Heirloom mailx
 The Heirloom Packaging Tools: pkgadd, pkgmk, etc.

Although in general the intention of the project is to provide versions of Unix programs whose behavior mimics that of the classic versions, some improvements have been made. In particular, many of the Heirloom programs have been adapted to handle UTF-8 Unicode. Most programs have both a classic version and a POSIX conformant variant.

External links

Mac OS X port
Retrocomputing Museum entry
GNU Autoconf manual: Systemology
heirloom-mailx package - Debian
The Heirloom Documentation Tools on GitHub
heirloom-ng fork on GitHub

Unix software